is a railway station on the Hakone Tozan Line located in Hakone, Kanagawa Prefecture, Japan. It is 14.3 rail kilometers from the line's terminus at Odawara Station, named after Hakone Open-Air Museum.

History
It was renamed to its present name on March 15, 1972 on the opening of the nearby Hakone Open-Air Museum of modern sculpture.

Lines
Hakone Tozan Railway
Hakone Tozan Line

Building
Chōkoku-no-mori Station has two opposed side platforms.

Platforms

Bus services
Hakone Tozan Bus
 for Kowaki-en (transfer for Moto-Hakone (Lake Ashi) direction), Yunessun, and Ten-yu
 for Hakone-Yumoto Station via Kowakidani Station, Miyanoshita, and Ohiradai Station
 for Gora Station, Gora Park, Hakone Art Museum (Kōen-Kami Station), Pola Museum of Art, The Little Prince and Saint-Exupéry Museum, Senkyoro-mae (transfer for Togendai (Lake Ashi)), Hakone Venetian Glass Museum, Sengoku (transfer for JR Gotemba Station and Shinjuku Station), Lalique Museum, and Hakone Botanical Garden of Wetlands
 for Gora Station, Miyagino (transfer for Togendai (Lake Ashi)), Hakone Venetian Glass Museum, Sengoku (transfer for Shinjuku Station), Otome Toge, Gotemba Premium Outlets, and JR Gotemba Station

References

External links
 Hakone Tozan Railway Official Site
 Hakone Tozan Bus Official Site

Railway stations in Japan opened in 1919
Railway stations in Kanagawa Prefecture
Buildings and structures in Hakone, Kanagawa